Satya Pahadi is a member of Constituent Assembly of Nepal. She is former Minister of Peace and Reconstruction of Nepal.

References

Living people
Women government ministers of Nepal
Communist Party of Nepal (Maoist Centre) politicians
Nepalese atheists
Nepal MPs 2017–2022
Nepal Communist Party (NCP) politicians
21st-century Nepalese women politicians
21st-century Nepalese politicians
Members of the 1st Nepalese Constituent Assembly
1977 births